The discography of Accept, a German heavy metal band, consists of 16 studio albums, five live albums, nine compilations, 25 singles, four video albums and 11 music videos. Formed in Solingen in 1976, Accept originally consisted of lead vocalist Udo Dirkschneider, lead guitarist Wolf Hoffmann, rhythm guitarist Gerard Wahl (later replaced by Jörg Fischer), bassist Peter Baltes and drummer Frank Friedrich. The band signed to Brain Records and released their self-titled debut album in 1979, which failed to chart. After Friedrich was replaced by Stefan Kaufmann, I'm a Rebel, Breaker and Restless and Wild (the group's first release after Fischer's departure) followed over the next three years, the last of which gave Accept their debut on the UK Albums Chart when it reached number 98.

The band signed with RCA Records and released Balls to the Wall in 1983, their first album with Fischer's replacement Herman Frank. It was the band's first domestic success, registering at number 59 on the German Albums Chart. The album also charted in the United States and Canada, receiving gold certifications in both regions. With Fischer later returning, the band's commercial recognition increased with their next two releases, as Metal Heart and Russian Roulette gave Accept their first German top 20 and top 10 chart positions, respectively. Dirkschneider was fired in 1987, but the band (with David Reece and without Fischer again) returned in 1989 with Eat the Heat, which peaked at number 15 in Germany. After a final touring cycle, Accept broke up in late 1989.

Reuniting with Dirkschneider, Accept returned in 1992 to record their comeback album Objection Overruled. Released the following year, it reached number 17 on the German Albums Chart. The group's popularity began to reduce in the 1990s, however, as 1994's Death Row peaked at number 32 and 1996's Predator peaked at number 56. Again, the band broke up in 1997. After a brief touring cycle in 2005, Accept reformed in 2009 with Hoffmann, Baltes, Frank joined by returning drummer Stefan Schwarzmann and new vocalist Mark Tornillo. Signed to Nuclear Blast, the band peaked at number 4 with 2010's Blood of the Nations and number 6 with 2012's Stalingrad: Brothers in Death, before achieving their first German Albums Chart number one with Blind Rage, released in 2014.

Accept parted ways with Frank and Schwarzmann in 2014, with their places taken in April 2015 by Uwe Lulis and Christopher Williams, respectively. In 2017 the band reached number 9 in Germany with the live album Restless and Live: Blind Rage Live in Europe 2015, before issuing The Rise of Chaos later in the year and reaching the top three. Another live release, Symphonic Terror: Live at Wacken 2017, also reached the German Albums Chart top 20 in 2018.

Albums

Studio albums

Live albums

Compilations

Singles

Videos

Video albums

Music videos

References

External links
Accept official website

Accept
Accept
Discography